The following outline is provided as an overview of and topical guide to religion:

Religion – organized collection of beliefs, cultural systems, and world views that relate humanity to an order of existence. Many religions have narratives, symbols, and sacred histories that are intended to explain the meaning of life and/or to explain the origin of life or the Universe. From their beliefs about the cosmos and human nature, people derive morality, ethics, religious laws or a preferred lifestyle. According to some estimates, there are roughly 4,200 religions in the world.

Classification

Demographics

List of religions

Religion by region 

 Religion by continent
 Africa • Antarctica • Asia • Europe • North America • Oceania (includes Australia) • South America

 Religion by political division, arranged alphabetically
 Religions by country
 Religion by political division, arranged by continent or major geopolitical region
 Religion in Africa

 Religion in West Africa 

 Benin • Burkina Faso • Cape Verde • Côte d'Ivoire • Gambia • Ghana • Guinea • Guinea-Bissau • Liberia • Mali • Mauritania • Niger • Nigeria • Senegal • Sierra Leone • Togo

 Religion in North Africa 

 Algeria • Egypt • Libya • Mauritania • Morocco • Sudan • South Sudan •Tunisia

 Religion in Central Africa 

 Angola • Burundi • Cameroon • Central African Republic • Chad • The Democratic Republic of the Congo • Equatorial Guinea • Gabon • Republic of the Congo • Rwanda • São Tomé and Príncipe

 Religion in East Africa 

 Burundi • Comoros • Djibouti • Eritrea • Ethiopia • Kenya • Madagascar • Malawi • Mauritius • Mozambique • Rwanda • Seychelles • Somalia (Somaliland) • Tanzania • Uganda • Zambia • Zimbabwe

 Religion in Southern Africa 

 Botswana • Eswatini • Lesotho • Namibia • South Africa 

 Religion in Antarctica

 Religion in Asia
 Religion in Central Asia
 Kazakhstan • Kyrgyzstan • Tajikistan • Turkmenistan • Uzbekistan
 Religion in East Asia
 China 
 Tibet

 Hong Kong • Macau
 Japan • North Korea • South Korea • Mongolia • Taiwan
 Religion in North Asia
 Russia
 Religion in Southeast Asia
 Brunei • Burma (Myanmar)  • Cambodia • East Timor (Timor-Leste) • Indonesia • Laos • Malaysia • Philippines • Singapore • Thailand • Vietnam
 Religion in South Asia
 Afghanistan • Bangladesh • Bhutan • Maldives • Nepal • Pakistan • Sri Lanka

 Religion in India
 States of India: Andhra Pradesh • Arunachal Pradesh • Assam • Bihar • Chhattisgarh • Goa • Gujarat • Haryana • Himachal Pradesh • Jammu and Kashmir • Jharkhand • Karnataka • Kerala • Madhya Pradesh • Maharashtra • Manipur • Meghalaya • Mizoram • Nagaland • Odisha • Punjab • Rajasthan • Sikkim • Tamil Nadu • Telangana • Tripura • Uttar Pradesh • Uttarakhand • West Bengal
 Religion in West Asia
 Armenia • Azerbaijan • Bahrain • Cyprus (including disputed Northern Cyprus) • Georgia • Iran • Iraq • Israel • Jordan • Kuwait • Lebanon • Oman • State of Palestine • Qatar • Saudi Arabia • Syria • Turkey • United Arab Emirates • Yemen

 Religion in the Caucasus (a region considered to be in both Asia and Europe, or between them)

 Religion in North Caucasus
 Parts of Russia (Chechnya, Ingushetia, Dagestan, Adyghea, Kabardino-Balkaria, Karachai-Cherkessia, North Ossetia, Krasnodar Krai, Stavropol Krai)

 Religion in South Caucasus
 Georgia (including disputed Abkhazia, South Ossetia) • Armenia •   Azerbaijan (including disputed Nagorno-Karabakh Republic)

 Religion in Europe 
 Akrotiri and Dhekelia • Åland • Albania • Andorra • Armenia • Austria • Azerbaijan • Belarus • Belgium • Bosnia and Herzegovina • Bulgaria • Croatia • Cyprus • Czech Republic • Denmark • Estonia • Faroe Islands • Finland • France • Georgia • Germany • Gibraltar • Greece • Guernsey • Hungary • Iceland • Ireland • Isle of Man • Italy • Jersey • Kazakhstan • Kosovo • Latvia • Liechtenstein • Lithuania • Luxembourg • Malta • Moldova (including disputed Transnistria) • Monaco • Montenegro • Netherlands • North Macedonia • Norway • Poland • Portugal • Romania • Russia • San Marino • Serbia • Slovakia • Slovenia •

Spain
 Autonomous communities of Spain: Catalonia
 Sweden • Switzerland • Turkey • Ukraine 
 United Kingdom
 England (Birmingham, Cornwall, London, Sussex) • Northern Ireland • Scotland • Wales
 Vatican City

 Religion in the European Union

 North America
 Canada  
 Religion in Provinces of Canada:  • Alberta  • British Columbia • Manitoba  • New Brunswick  • Newfoundland and Labrador  • Nova Scotia  • Ontario (Toronto) • Prince Edward Island  • Quebec • Saskatchewan
 Religion in Territories of Canada: Northwest Territories • Nunavut  • Yukon

Greenland • Saint Pierre and Miquelon

 United States 

 Alabama • Alaska • Arizona • Arkansas • California • Colorado • Connecticut • Delaware • Florida • Georgia • Hawaii • Idaho • Illinois • Indiana • Iowa • Kansas • Kentucky • Louisiana • Maine • Maryland • Massachusetts • Michigan • Minnesota • Mississippi • Missouri • Montana • Nebraska • Nevada • New Hampshire • New Jersey • New Mexico • New York • North Carolina • North Dakota • Ohio • Oklahoma • Oregon • Pennsylvania (Philadelphia) • Rhode Island • South Carolina • South Dakota • Tennessee • Texas • Utah • Vermont • Virginia • Washington • Religion in Washington, D.C. • West Virginia • Wisconsin • Wyoming

 Mexico 

 Religion in Central America
 Belize • Costa Rica • El Salvador • Guatemala • Honduras • Nicaragua • Panama

 Religion in the Caribbean
 Anguilla • Antigua and Barbuda • Aruba • Bahamas • Barbados • Bermuda • British Virgin Islands • Cayman Islands • Cuba • Dominica • Dominican Republic • Grenada •  Haiti • Jamaica •  Montserrat •  Netherlands Antilles •  Puerto Rico • Saint Barthélemy • Saint Kitts and Nevis • Saint Lucia •  Saint Martin • Saint Vincent and the Grenadines • Trinidad and Tobago •  Turks and Caicos Islands • United States Virgin Islands

Religion in Oceania (includes the continent of Australia)
 Religion in Australasia
 Australia 
 Religion in Dependencies/Territories of Australia
 Christmas Island • Cocos (Keeling) Islands •   Norfolk Island
 New Zealand
 Religion in Melanesia
 Fiji • Indonesia (Oceanian part only) • New Caledonia (France) • Papua New Guinea • Solomon Islands • Vanuatu •
 Religion in Micronesia
 Federated States of Micronesia • Guam (USA) • Kiribati • Marshall Islands • Nauru • Northern Mariana Islands (USA) • Palau • Wake Island (USA) •
 Religion in Polynesia
 American Samoa (USA) • Chatham Islands (NZ) • Cook Islands (NZ) • Easter Island (Chile) • French Polynesia (France)  • Hawaii (USA) • Loyalty Islands (France) • Niue (NZ) • Pitcairn Islands (UK) • Adamstown • Samoa • Tokelau (NZ) • Tonga • Tuvalu • Wallis and Futuna (France)

 Religion in South America 
 Argentina • Bolivia • Brazil • Chile • Colombia • Ecuador • Falkland Islands • Guyana • Paraguay • Peru • Suriname • Uruguay • Venezuela

Religious studies

 Anthropology of religion
 Cognitive science of religion
 Comparative religion
 Evolutionary origin of religions
 Evolutionary psychology of religion
 History of religion
 Nonviolence
 Philosophy of religion
 Suffering
 Psychology of religion
 Sociology of religion
 Vegetarianism and religion

Religious concepts

Religious belief

 Acosmism
 Angel
 Demon
 Demonology
 List of theological demons
 Animism
 Doctrine
 Eschatology
 Esotericism
 Faith
 Free will
 Gnosticism
 Goodness and evil
 Holy Land
 Humanism
 Ietsism
 Karma
 Religion and LGBT people
 Life after death
 Mysticism
 Mythology
 Pain and Suffering
 Prophet
 Reincarnation
 Religious cosmology
 Creation myth
 Religious naturalism
 Sacred
 Sacred space
 Sacred time
 Shamanism
 Sin
 Soul
 Spirituality
 List of spirituality-related topics
 Supernaturalism
 Tao
 Theology
 Agnosticism
 Antitheism
 Atheism
 Deism
 Deity
 List of deities
 Dualism
 God
 Henotheism
 Immanence
 Monism
 Monolatrism
 Monotheism
 Nondualism
 Nontheistic religions
 Pandeism
 Panentheism
 Pantheism
 Polytheism
 Post-theism
 Theism
 Transcendence
Divination
Prophecy

Approaches to the beliefs of others
 Exclusivism
 Inclusivism

Religious behaviour and experiences
 Asceticism
 Meditation
 Memes in religion
 Nonviolence
 Pilgrimage
 Places of worship
 Prayer
 Religious experience
 Religious war
 Ritual

Religion-specific topics

African traditional and diasporic topics

Anitism topics 

 Anito
 Philippine shamans
 Bathala
 Dambana

Ayyavazhi topics 

 Ayyavazhi scriptures
 List of Ayyavazhi-related topics

Bábism topics

Baháʼí Faith topics 

 ʻAbdu'l-Bahá
 The Báb
 Baháʼí teachings
 Baháʼu'lláh
 History of the Baháʼí Faith

Buddhism topics 

 Attainment
 Arahant
 Bodhisattva
 Buddha
 Basic concepts
 Four Noble Truths
 Five Aggregates
 Three marks of existence
 Dependent Origination
 Karma
 Rebirth
 Saṃsāra
 Nirvana
 Noble Eightfold Path
 Branches of Buddhism
 Theravada
 Mahayana
 Vajrayana
 Buddhism by country
 Buddhist monasticism
 Monk
 Nun
 Buddhist philosophy
 Buddhist texts
 Mahayana sutras
 Pāli Canon
 Cultural elements of Buddhism
 Gautama Buddha
 Glossary of Buddhism
 History of Buddhism
 Index of Buddhism-related articles
 List of Buddhists
 Practice
 Meditation
 Buddhist vegetarianism
 Morality
 Wisdom
 Three Jewels
 Buddha (the Teacher)
 Dhamma (the Teaching)
 Sangha (the Community)

Cao Dai topics 
 Cao Dai

Christianity topics 

 Christian vegetarianism
 Christianity by country
 Eastern Christianity
 History of Christianity
 List of Christian denominations
 List of Jesus-related articles
 List of Latter Day Saint movement topics
 Roman Catholicism
 List of popes
 List of saints
 Roman Catholicism by country
 Protestantism
 Protestantism by country
 Religious texts
 Bible
 Garden of Eden references to herbivorous diet
 Antilegomena
 Deuterocanonical books
 Gospels 
 Epistles 
 New Testament
 Old Testament
 Timeline of Christian missions

Hinduism topics 

 Diet in Hinduism
 Hindu denominations
 History of Hinduism
 List of Hinduism-related articles

Islam topics 

 Allah
 Ninety-nine names of Allah
 Glossary of Islam
 Hajj
 History of Islam
 Index of Islamic and Muslim related articles
 Islam by country
 Islamic schools and branches
 Ahmadiyya
 Sunni
 Shia
 Sufi
 Muhammad
 Religious texts
 Hadith
 Hadith collections
 Nahj al-Balagha
 Sahih Bukhari
 Hadith Qudsi
 Isnad – Ilm ar-rijal – Narrators of hadith
 Matn
 List of Islamic texts
 Quran – Sura – Ayat
 Asbab al-nuzul
 Naskh
 Quranic literalism
 Tafsir Qudsi – tafsir
 Salat
 Zakat

Jainism topics 

 History of Jainism
 Jain vegetarianism
 Nonviolence (Ahimsa) applied to animals

Judaism topics 

 Israel
 Jew
 Jewish
 Jewish religious movements
 Jewish vegetarianism
 Judaism by country
 List of Jewish history topics
 Origins of Judaism

Modern Paganism topics 

 Asatru
 Kemetism
 List of Modern pagan movements
 Neoshamanism
 Wicca
 Witchcraft

New Age topics
 List of New Age topics

New religious movement topics

 List of new religious movements

Open source religion topics

Rasta topics 

 Mansions of Rastafari

Satanism topics 

 LaVeyan Satanism
 Theistic Satanism
 Black mass
 Conjuration
 Deal with the Devil
 Demonolatry

Shintō topics 

 Shinto sects and schools

Sikhism topics 

 Diet in Sikhism
 History of Sikhism
 Sikh gurus
 Sikh scriptures
 Bani – Gurbani
 Chaupai
 Dasam Granth
 Guru Granth Sahib
 Jaap Sahib
 Japji Sahib
 Mul Mantra
 Sukhmani Sahib

Spiritism topics 

 History of Spiritism

Taoism topics 

 History of Taoism
 Taoist schools
 Taoist meditation
 Taoist scripture

Tenrikyo topics 

 Joyous Life
 Ofudesaki
 Osashizu
 Oyasama
 Tenri-O-no-Mikoto

Unitarian Universalism topics

Vegetarianism and religion topics 

 Philosophic issues in topics in religion and vegetarianism
 Exogenous criticism of other religions where there may be vegetarianism
 Endogenous criticism of behaviors within one's own religion
 Epistemological concerns about relative legitimacy of religious grounds for vegetarian practice in light of modern science grounds for vegetarian practice

In Indian religions
 Indian religions
 Hinduism
 Jainism
 Buddhism
 Sikhism

In Abrahamic religions
 Abrahamic religions
 Judaism
 Christianity
Bible Christian Church
Seventh-day Adventists
Christian Vegetarian Association
universal veg(etari)anism
atonement
Eastern Christianity
 fasts 210 days out of the year
 fasting during the Great Lent
 Sarx
 CreatureKind
 Islam
 Animals in Islam
 Rastafari
 Baháʼí Faith

In Other religions
 Zoroastrianism
 Mazdakism
 Nation of Islam
 Taoism
 Faithist/Oahspe
 Neopaganism
 Meher Baba's teachings

Zoroastrianism topics 

 Avesta
 Zoroaster

Irreligion topics 

 Agnosticism
 Anarchism and animal rights
 Antireligion
 Atheism
 Freethought
 Ignosticism
 Metaphysical realism
 Metaphysical naturalism
 Nontheism
 Pessimism
 Religious skepticism
 Secular humanism

Religion and religious ideas in fiction 
 Religion in fantasy
 Religion in science fiction

See also

References

External links

Studying Religion – Introduction to the methods and scholars of the academic study of religion
Full-text search engine – Searchable sacred texts of the major World Religions
Patheos.com – Offers a comprehensive library with essays written by prominent religious scholars
Guide to World Religions
A Contribution to the Critique of Hegel's Philosophy of Right – Marx's original reference to religion as the opium of the people.
Religious tolerance
The Complexity of Religion and the Definition of “Religion” in International Law Harvard Human Rights Journal article from the President and Fellows of Harvard College(2003)

Religion
Religion